The Australian Club Championship  is a rugby union challenge match between the Brisbane and Sydney club premiers. The fixture was played on a regular basis from 1982 to 1991 (inclusive) and again since 2007, and also on an ad hoc basis in various other years.  The regular scheduling was initially abandoned in 1993 when the NSWRU insisted on playing each match at Concord Oval in Sydney, rather than on a rotating basis. The championship was revived when it was agreed that the winners of the 2006 premierships would play the challenge match as a curtain raiser to the following year's Queensland Reds and NSW Waratahs match in the Super 14 competition.  A women's match was first played in 2023.

Winners summary
 Winners by City
18 wins: Sydney Premiers
11 wins: Brisbane Premiers
 Multiple Winners
 6 wins: Randwick
 6 wins: Sydney University
 4 wins: Brothers
 2 wins: Easts (Brisbane)
 2 wins: Eastwood
 2 wins: University of Queensland

Men's Results

This is not necessarily a definitive list of all matches played.

Women's Results

Notes

References

Rugby union competitions in Australia
1908 establishments in Australia